Lara is a feature on Earth's Moon, a crater in Taurus-Littrow valley.  Astronauts Eugene Cernan and Harrison Schmitt visited it in 1972, on the Apollo 17 mission, during EVA 2.  Geology Station 3 of the mission is located on the northeast rim of Lara.

Lara is located in the 'light mantle' which is almost certainly an avalanche deposit from the South Massif.  To the south of Lara is Nansen crater and Geology Station 2.  To the northeast is Shorty crater and Geology Station 4.

The crater was named by the astronauts after the heroine of the novel Doctor Zhivago by Boris Pasternak.

References

External links
43D1S2(25) Apollo 17 Traverses at Lunar and Planetary Institute
Geological Investigation of the Taurus-Littrow Valley: Apollo 17 Landing Site

Impact craters on the Moon
Apollo 17